Sayed Jaafar Ahmed (born 4 March 1991) is a Bahraini professional footballer who plays as a midfielder for Riffa S.C.

International

International goals
Scores and results list Bahrain's goal tally first.

References

External links 
 

1991 births
Living people
Bahraini footballers
Bahrain international footballers
Association football midfielders
2015 AFC Asian Cup players